Motyginsky District is an administrative and municipal district (raion), one of the forty-three in Krasnoyarsk Krai, Russia. It is located in the center of the krai and borders with Severo-Yeniseysky District in the north, Evenkiysky District in the northeast, Boguchansky District in the east, Taseyevsky District in the south, Kazachinsky District in the southwest, and with Yeniseysky District in the west. Its administrative center is the urban locality (an urban-type settlement) of Motygino. Population:  19,140 (2002 Census);  The population of Motygino accounts for 36.4% of the district's total population.

Geography
The district is located in the Angara River valley.

History
The district was founded on July 1, 1931.

Government
As of 2013, the Head of the district and the Chairman of the District Council is Vladimir A. Funk.

References

Notes

Sources

Districts of Krasnoyarsk Krai
States and territories established in 1931
1931 establishments in the Soviet Union